Nathalia Siqueira Almeida (born 14 December 1996) is a Brazilian swimmer. She competed in the women's 4 × 200 metre freestyle relay at the 2020 Summer Olympics.

In 2013, Almeida competed in the Junior Swimming World Championship and was fifth in the 4x100m Freestyle and 4x200m Freestyle. The following year, she won the gold medal in the South American Championship in Argentina in the 4x200m Freestyle event and the bronze in the 200m Butterfly. In the pre-Olympic championship that defined the Brazilian team for the Rio 2016 Games, Nathalia came close to getting a place in the Olympics that year in the 200m medley. She won a gold medal at the 2018 World Military Championship in Russia. In the same season, she secured third place in the 200m Butterfly at the South American Championship in Peru (2018).

She competed in the 2020 Summer Olympics, where she finished 10th in the Women's 4 × 200 metre freestyle relay, along with Larissa Oliveira, Aline Rodrigues and Gabrielle Roncatto.

At the 2021 FINA World Swimming Championships (25 m) in Abu Dhabi, she finished 7th in the Women's 4 × 200 metre freestyle relay, along with Giovanna Diamante, Viviane Jungblut and Gabrielle Roncatto; 12th in the Women's 400 metre freestyle; 14th in the Women's 400 metre individual medley 19th in the Women's 200 metre individual medley, and 23rd in the Women's 100 metre individual medley.;

References

External links
 

1996 births
Living people
Brazilian female butterfly swimmers
Brazilian female freestyle swimmers
Brazilian female medley swimmers
Olympic swimmers of Brazil
Swimmers at the 2020 Summer Olympics
Swimmers from Rio de Janeiro (city)
21st-century Brazilian women
20th-century Brazilian women
Competitors at the 2022 South American Games
South American Games medalists in swimming
South American Games silver medalists for Brazil
South American Games bronze medalists for Brazil